Acalolepta speciosa is a species of beetle in the family Cerambycidae found in Asia in countries such as the China and Vietnam.

Acalolepta
Beetles described in 1888